William Pike Hall Jr., known as Pike Hall Jr. (May 27, 1931 – November 25, 1999), was an associate justice of the Louisiana Supreme Court from 1990 to 1994.

Hall attended Washington and Lee University in Lexington, Virginia, and Louisiana State University, and received a J.D. from the Louisiana State University Law Center in Baton Rouge in 1953.

Hall practiced in Shreveport for a time, and served on the Caddo Parish School Board. In 1970, Hall was elected to the Louisiana Court of Appeal for the Second Circuit, where he served until 1990, when he became an associate justice of the Louisiana Supreme Court. He served in that position until his retirement from the bench in 1994.

Hall died in Shreveport at the age of 68. The appeals court building in Shreveport was named in his honor.

References

 

 

1931 births
1999 deaths
Politicians from Shreveport, Louisiana
School board members in Louisiana
Louisiana state court judges
Circuit court judges in the United States
Justices of the Louisiana Supreme Court
Louisiana Democrats
Louisiana lawyers
C. E. Byrd High School alumni
Washington and Lee University alumni
Louisiana State University alumni
Louisiana State University Law Center alumni
American United Methodists